José Luzón Morales was a Spanish anarchist militant who was part of the "Spartacus" battalion in the Spanish Civil War.

Biography 
A member of the National Confederation of Labor (CNT), after the outbreak of the Spanish Civil War he joined the confederal militias.

He was part of the "Spartacus" battalion, of anarcho-syndicalist affiliation. Later he became an honorary officer of the National Republican Guard (GNR), where he chaired the GNR purification commission. Luzón established a prison for former Civil Guards in a Salesian convent in Madrid.  In mid-1937 he received the command of the 70th Mixed Brigade, which, integrated into the 14th Division, took part in the Battle of Brunete. In March 1939, after the Casado coup, he was appointed commander of the 33rd Division. At the end of the war, he fled Spain by plane, moving to Oran.

In 1945, in the context of the split suffered by the libertarian movement, Luzon aligned himself with the positions of the so-called "collaborationist" tendency. In 1948 he was brutally beaten and arrested by the police in Toulouse on charges of illegal possession of weapons. José Luzón allegedly committed suicide in the cell where he was detained.

Notes

References

Bibliography
 
 
 
 
 

1948 deaths
Confederación Nacional del Trabajo members
Spanish military personnel of the Spanish Civil War (Republican faction)
Spanish anarchists
Murdered anarchists
Death conspiracy theories